Gabby Johnson may refer to:
 Gabby Johnson, a character on the soap opera Family Affairs in 1999–2000.
 Gabby Johnson, a character in the 1974 movie Blazing Saddles